This is a list of seasons completed by the San Diego State Aztecs football team of the National Collegiate Athletic Association (NCAA) Division I Football Bowl Subdivision (FBS). The team began competition in 1921.

San Diego State has been a member of a conference for all but a few seasons since it started play

 Member of the Southern California Junior College Conference 1921–1924
 Member of the Southern California Intercollegiate Athletic Conference 1926–1938
 Charter Member of the California Collegiate Athletic Association 1939–1967
 Charter Member of the Pacific Coast Athletic Association 1969–1975
 Member of the Western Athletic Conference 1978–1998
 Member of the Mountain West Conference 1999–Present

When the NCAA first started classification in 1937, San Diego State was part of the NCAA College Division (Small College). While playing in the College Division under College Hall of Fame coach Don Coryell, they were voted the football National Champion for three consecutive years, 1966–1968. They moved to the NCAA University Division (Major College) in 1969.

Seasons

References

San Diego State

San Diego State Aztecs football seasons
San Diego State Aztecs football seasons